John Egleton (1698-1727) was a British stage actor.

He was a member of the Lincoln's Inn Fields company between 1717 and 1726, and also routinely performed at the summer fairs in London. In 1721 he married the actress Jane Giffard.

Selected roles
 Florio in The Traitor by Christopher Bullock (1718)
 Ranger  in The Coquet by Charles Molloy (1718)
 Varnish in Kensington Gardens by John Leigh (1719)
 Ravillac in Henry IV of France by Charles Beckingham (1719)
 Carew in Sir Walter Raleigh by George Sewell (1719)
 Honoric in The Imperial Captives by John Mottley (1720)
 Woodville in Hob's Wedding by John Leigh (1720)
 Arsaces in Antiochus by John Mottley (1721)
 Achmat in The Fair Captive by Eliza Haywood (1721)
 Jerry in Hanging and Marriage by Henry Carey (1722)
 Idas in Love and Duty by John Sturmy (1722)
 O'Connor in Hibernia Freed by William Phillips (1722)
 Attalus in The Fatal Legacy by Jane Robe (1723)
 Macro in Belisarius by William Phillips (1724)
 Pander in The Bath Unmasked by Gabriel Odingsells (1725)

References

Bibliography
 Highfill, Philip H, Burnim, Kalman A. & Langhans, Edward A. A Biographical Dictionary of Actors, Actresses, Musicians, Dancers, Managers, and Other Stage Personnel in London, 1660-1800: Garrick to Gyngell. SIU Press, 1978.
 Johanson, Kristine. Shakespeare Adaptations from the Early Eighteenth Century: Five Plays. Rowman & Littlefield, 2013.

18th-century English people
English male stage actors
British male stage actors
18th-century English male actors
18th-century British male actors
1698 births
1727 deaths